Basantpur is a village in Pachperwa Block, Balrampur district of Uttar Pradesh State, India.

Demographics
As of 2011 Indian Census, Basantpur had a total population of 3,776, of which 2,012 were males and 1,764 were females. Population within the age group of 0 to 6 years was 631. The total number of literates in Basantpur was 1,561, which constituted 41.3% of the population with male literacy of 48.0% and female literacy of 33.8%. The effective literacy rate of 7+ population of Basantpur was 49.6%, of which male literacy rate was 57.9% and female literacy rate was 40.3%. The Scheduled Castes population was 131. Basantpur had 475 households in 2011.

Politics 
The sarpanch of Basantpur is Shabnam Khan. The panchayat has 5 ward members chosen by the people through polling.

Transport 
Nearest railway station is Pachperwa railway station.

See also 
 Bargadwa Saif
 Ganeshpur

References 

Villages in Balrampur district, Uttar Pradesh